Þorsteinsson is a surname of Icelandic origin, meaning son of Þorsteinn. In Icelandic names, the name is not strictly a surname, but a patronymic. The name may refer to:

 Indriði G. Þorsteinsson (1926–2000), Icelandic novelist and short-story writer
 Jón Dagur Þorsteinsson (born 1998), Icelandic footballer
 Klængur Þorsteinsson (1102–1176), Icelandic Roman Catholic clergyman; bishop of Iceland 1152–76
 Magnús Þorsteinsson (contemporary), Icelandic businessman; chairman and boardmember of several large businesses
 Pétur Þorsteinsson (born 1955), Icelandic priest and neologist; leader of an Icelandic language movement
 Skúli Þórsteinsson (fl. 11th century), Icelandic  poet and warrior
 Þorsteinn Þorsteinsson (1880–1979), Icelandic economist and Esperantist
 Þorsteinn Þorsteinsson (athlete) (born 1947), Icelandic athlete who competed in the 800 metres
 Þorsteinn Þorsteinsson (footballer) (born 1964), Icelandic footballer

Icelandic-language surnames
Surnames